Pomaderris viridis is a species of flowering plant in the family Rhamnaceae and is endemic to south-eastern continental Australia. It is a shrub or small tree with hairy young stems, egg-shaped to elliptic leaves, and panicles of cream-coloured to pale yellowish-green flowers.

Description
Flowering occurs in November.

Taxonomy
Pomaderris viridis was first formally described in 2008 by Neville Grant Walsh in the journal Muelleria from specimens he collected in 1994 from Coolangubrah State Forest (now part of the South East Forests National Park). The specific epithet (viridis) means "green", referring to the general aspect of the plant and the relatively green upper and lower surfaces of the leaves.

Distribution and habitat
This pomaderris grows in rocky sites, usually near watercourses in forest. It is found in isolated populations between Bemboka, Brogo and Towamba in south-eastern New South Wales. There is also a single record from Bellbird Creek in East Gippsland in Victoria.

References

Flora of Victoria (Australia)
Flora of New South Wales
viridis
Plants described in 2008
Taxa named by Neville Grant Walsh